The Natural Law Party of Ontario ran several candidates in the 1995 provincial election, none of whom were elected.

Monique Poudrette (Hamilton Centre)

Poudrette was fifty-five years old at the time of the election.  She was a transcendental meditation teacher living in Toronto, and was listed as holding a Bachelor of Commerce degree.  She supported tax reductions and a simplified tax system (Hamilton Spectator, 27 May 1995).  Poudrette received 331 votes (1.52%), finishing fifth against New Democratic Party incumbent David Christopherson.

Marcy Sheremetta (St. Catharines)

Sheremetta is a reverend in the Niagara Peninsula, working with an organization called Holistic Living.  She received 153 votes (0.52%), finishing fifth against Liberal incumbent Jim Bradley.

Vivek Narula (Windsor—Walkerville)

Narula grew up in Chatham, and lived in Toronto at the time of the 1995 election.  He graduated from Maharishi High School in Fairfield, Iowa in 1987, and described himself as a professional writer.  (Windsor Star, 3 June 1995).  He received 156 votes (0.63%), finishing last in a field of five candidates.  The winner was Dwight Duncan of the Ontario Liberal Party.

In 2004, an individual named Vivek Narula joined the Canadian company New Media Architects, Ltd. as Marketing Manager.  He holds a Bachelor of Arts degree in Business Administration and a Master of Arts degree in Creative Writing.  It is not clear if this is the same person.

Candidates in Ontario provincial elections
1995